Leucauge celebesiana, commonly called the black-striped orchard spider, is a species of spider belonging to the family Tetragnathidae. It is found from India to China, Japan, Sulawesi and New Guinea.

Like many of its congeners, this is a colourful and distinctive spider. The abdomen is white with yellow-green sides with black stripes separating the white from the coloured flanks. Another black stripe runs right down the middle. This species constructs a web inclined at 45° and several individuals often build these webs close together.

Leucauge subblanda is a similar spider found in Japan.

References

 (2009): The world spider catalog, version 9.5. American Museum of Natural History.

celebesiana
Spiders described in 1842
Spiders of Asia